Palle Mikkelborg (born 6 March 1941) is a Danish jazz trumpet player, composer, arranger and record producer. 

He is self-taught on the trumpet, although he studied conducting at the Royal Music Conservatory in Copenhagen. He became a professional musician in 1960 and joined the Danish Radiojazzgruppen three years later. Mikkelborg became their leader in 1967 and retained that position until 1972. In addition, he was a member of the Radioens Big Band over a similar time frame. He played trumpet in both, but also wrote, arranged, and conducted both.  Forming a jazz quintet with drummer, Alex Riel they performed at the Montreux Jazz Festival and Newport Jazz Festival (1968). He later led an octet, V8, in the 1970s, and another outfit, Entrance, from the mid-1970s until 1985.  His composition were made for various ensembles, including extended pieces for larger outfits.

In 1984, he composed Aura, a tribute to Miles Davis.

Discography
As Leader
The Mysterious Corona (Debut, 1967)
Anything but Grey (Columbia, 1992)
Futopia (Columbia, 1993)
Song .... Tread Lightly (Columbia, 2000)
Voice of Silence: Homage to the Louisiana Museum of Modern Art (Stunt, 2013)

With Danish Radio Big Band
 Brownsville Trolley Line (Sonet, 1970) as conductor – recorded in 1969

With Miles Davis
Aura (Columbia, 1989)

With Dexter Gordon 
More Than You Know (SteepleChase, 1975)
The Other Side of Round Midnight (Blue Note, 1986)
With  Philip Catherine

 September Man (Atlantic, 1974)

With George Gruntz
Theatre (ECM, 1983)
With Gary Peacock
Guamba (ECM, 1987)

With Terje Rypdal
Waves (ECM, 1978) 
Descendre (ECM, 1979)
Skywards (ECM, 1995) 
Lux Aeterna (ECM, 2000)
Vossabrygg (ECM, 2003)
With Dino Saluzzi
Once Upon a Time - Far Away in the South (ECM, 1985)
With Edward Vesala
Satu (ECM, 1977)
With Thomas Clausen
Even Closer (ARTS, 2011)
With Jakob Bro
Returnings (ECM, 2018)

References

External links

1941 births
Experimental composers
Post-bop trumpeters
Danish jazz trumpeters
Danish jazz composers
Living people
Miles Davis
Danish session musicians
20th-century trumpeters
21st-century trumpeters
21st-century American composers
20th-century Danish musicians
21st-century Danish musicians
20th-century American composers
DR Big Band members
20th-century jazz composers
21st-century jazz composers